Fabien Eboussi Boulaga (17 January 1934 – 13 October 2018) was a Cameroonian philosopher.

Biography
Born in 1934 in Bafia, Eboussi Boulaga earned his high school diploma from the Akono Minor Seminary (South Cameroon), before joining the Society of Jesus (Jesuits) in 1955. He was ordained as a priest in 1969, and became an official member of the Society of Jesus in 1973. He became known as a polemical figure, for example in his book Bantou problématique (1968), and in his theological stance, notably in La démission (1974), which caused an outcry in ecclesiastical circles; this latter publication called for the organised departure of missionaries. Three years later, he published La Crise du Muntu, which tackled questions of authenticity and tradition, a particularly fashionable topic in the 1970s. In 1980, he decided to leave the Jesuits and asked to return to secular life. Boulaga's departure from sacerdotal and religious life was the product of a carefully matured decision; he claimed to have "lost his faith" since 1969. A year later, he published Christianisme sans fétiche, which questions the dogmatic and metaphysical assumptions of Catholicism in a colonial context. Boulaga has a Bachelors in Theology from the University of Lyon, and a Doctor of Philosophy and of Letters, and was a teacher in Abidjan, then professor at the University of Yaoundé.

In the 1980s, Boulaga became active in associations for the defence of human rights. He published works, first on theology, and then on politics. From 1994 to his death, he was a professor at the Catholic University of Central Africa.

Bibliography 
 La crise du Muntu, Authenticité africaine et philosophie, Présence africaine, Paris, 1977 et 1997. English translation, Muntu in Crisis: African Authenticity and Philosophy, Trenton, 2014.
 Christianisme sans fétiche, Présence africaine, Paris, 1981.
 A contretemps, L’enjeu de Dieu en Afrique, Karthala, Paris 1992.
 Les conférences nationales en Afrique, Une affaire à suivre, Karthala, Paris, 1993.
 La démocratie de transit au Cameroun, L'Harmattan, Paris, 1997.
 Lignes de résistance, Éditions CLE, Yaoundé, 1999.
 Christianity without fetishes, Orbis, New York, 1985.
 Christianity without fetishes, Lit Verlag, Germany, 2002
 Le génocide rwandais - Les interrogations des intellectuels africains, (Sous dir.), Éditions CLE, Yaoundé, 2006.
 La dialectique de la foi et de la raison (Sous la direction), éditions terroirs, Yaoundé, 319 pages, 2007.
 L'Affaire de la philosophie africaine. Au-delà des querelles, Karthala-éditions terroirs, Paris-Yaoundé, 2011.

References

1934 births
2018 deaths
People from Centre Region (Cameroon)
Cameroonian philosophers
Former Jesuits